Private Passions is a weekly music discussion programme that has been running since 15 April 1995 on BBC Radio 3, presented by the composer Michael Berkeley.  The production was formerly made by Classic Arts Productions, a British radio and audio production company that provided programmes to the BBC until June 2013.  Since June 2013, it has been produced by Loftus Audio. The producers are Elizabeth Burke, Jane Greenwood and Olivia Seligman.

The one-hour show is broadcast almost every Sunday at 12:00 in the UK, and is available on demand through the BBC website, where it is possible to listen to the last seven days of Radio 3 broadcasts. Every week Berkeley interviews a notable guest about their life and musical interests and plays a selection of their favourite pieces. The emphasis is on classical music, but also embraces jazz, world music and popular song. The "life and works" aspect of the interview is generally secondary to the discussion about musical passions, and Berkeley often aims to explore a guest's unexpected musical interests.

There are programs that are compilations covering a particular topic or a fictitious guest. Writer Ian McEwan has described it as "musically and psychologically irresistible. Probably the best programme on radio in Britain." The Private Passions book charts the show's first decade, listing all the guests and their choices of music. The programme's theme tune is Michael Berkeley's "The Wakeful Poet" (from Music from Chaucer) performed by the Beaux-Arts Brass Quintet.

References

External links 

BBC Radio 3 programmes
British classical music radio programmes
1995 radio programme debuts